Camilo Sánchez (born 30 August 1997) is a Belizean association footballer.

Club career

Belize Defence Force
He started out in his native Belize, playing for Premier League of Belize club Belize Defence Force, for whom he scored 14 goals.

International career
Having been called up for the CONCACAF Nations League squad, he made his international debut on 8 September 2019, from the bench in a 2–1 defeat at home to Grenada.

References

Living people
1997 births
Belizean footballers
Belize international footballers
Association football forwards